Austin is a station on the 'L' system, serving the Blue Line's Forest Park branch. The station has an auxiliary entrance/exit at Lombard Avenue. After CTA Blue Line trains pass the station, the CTA line splits away from the Baltimore and Ohio Chicago Terminal Railroad lines letting the CTA Blue Line continue into Chicago afterwards.

Bus connections
CTA
  91 Austin 

Pace
  315 Austin Boulevard

References

External links

 Austin (Congress Line) Station Page
Lombard Avenue entrance from Google Maps Street View
Austin Boulevard entrance from Google Maps Street View

CTA Blue Line stations
Railway stations in the United States opened in 1960
Oak Park, Illinois
1960 establishments in Illinois